Marc Bourcier is a Canadian politician, who has been the mayor of Saint-Jérôme, Quebec since the 2021 mayoral election. Previously, he was elected to the National Assembly of Quebec in a by-election on December 5, 2016, and served until 2018. He represented the electoral district of Saint-Jérôme as a member of the Parti Québécois caucus. Prior to his by-election in the legislature, he was a city councillor for Saint-Jérôme City Council.

Electoral record

References 

Living people
Canadian schoolteachers
Parti Québécois MNAs
Mayors of places in Quebec
Quebec municipal councillors
People from Saint-Jérôme
Year of birth missing (living people)